Olufuko is an Aawambo traditional practice where girls often as young as 12 are prepared for womanhood, including marriage and pregnancy, and caring for families. This practice is performed by an elderly man, known as Namunganga, and is accompanied by drumming and dancing. It is a practice that turns girls and young women into brides without grooms. Over the years this initiation practice has been banned by the mainstream Christian churches, labelling the practice pagan, and against Christianity.

According to tradition, the girls cannot reject Olufuko, because it is believed that rejection would bring a curse upon them (e.g. they may never get married ). Those that reject Olufuko face misfortunes, including falling victim to unwanted pregnancies, not being able to bear children or facing the death of a parent, as a result of the curse.
Thus, traditionally a girl who turns down Olufuko would be manhand-led, tied up and dragged to the Olufuko homestead. Meekulu Saara Walaula, who is the wife of the Aambadja Senior Chief Tatekulu Mathias Walaula, said the Olufuko initiation lasts for seven days and each day serves a purpose in the process. The person ordained to carry out Olufuko is called Namunganga. Haha

Process
Olufuko commences with a day called ekoho when the brides' mothers prepare the fireplaces where the food of the brides-to-be is prepared. This is followed by omakunde and okambadjona when the parents of the brides-to-be slaughter cattle for their daughters. The fourth day is efundula (the wedding day). From that day on, the girls are officially confirmed as prospective brides. Single men and even polygamists may start to show their interest in the prospective brides, by placing jewellery or bracelets on the wrists of the women of their choice. The woman has the right to choose any of the men or to reject them all. The fifth day is called epito letanda, or the initiation day; the rituals on that day include a walk around the Olufuko homestead at night when everyone is asleep and getting back to the house through a special entrance. That night the brides sleep in Ondjuwo, a special hut built for them.

According to the prevailing belief, pregnant brides or girls that have had an abortion can never go through the rituals and will not be able to even if they wished to, due to the influence of supernatural forces or powers. After the rituals the girls are officially prospective brides and will be referred to as such until the time that they meet a man or when they eventually fall pregnant. On the last day, the girls are then "cleansed" by rubbing their bodies with butter mixed with traditional red dye or ochre with Oshifima (porridge); the butter and dye mixture is also smeared on the girls at the commencement of the ceremony. On this day, which is known as Okandjibululwena, mothers and brides can leave the Olufuko homestead and go back to their homes.

Bringing back Olufuko ceremony.
The Olufuko was last held 80 years ago until it was recently held by the Omusati Regional Council in conjunction with the Outapi Town Council and traditional authorities at the Outapi town in the northern region of Namibia.

Namrights said Olufuko is "discriminatory and degrading against girls". Opponents argue that Olufuko will contribute to the spread of HIV/AIDS, dropping out of school, teenage pregnancy and promiscuity and have called it unconstitutional.
They claim that Olufuko is an infringement of human rights, since young girls are forced into this initiation process.
In defending the event, Olufuko, which means wedding in Oshiwambo, is a process where girls, as young as 14 years old, are commissioned as 'brides'. After Olufuko, the prospective bride, no matter the age, is free to get a man and get married any time. Pregnancy before marriage after Olufuko is acceptable and is not a taboo. People under the age of 16 are considered minors under the Namibian Constitution.

Olufuko in Modern Culture
Olufuko is the theme of an annual festival, hosted in Outapi, Omusati Region, Namibia. The Olufuko Festival was launched in 2012.

The Founding President of the Republic of Namibia and Father of the Namibian Nation H.E. Dr. Sam Nujoma is the patron of Olufuko Festival. Sam Nujoma emphasized that a “nation without a culture and tradition is not a nation, with all the contradictions, this event was a success and will strive to continue taking place under the slogan Our Heritage Our Pride.

References

External links
Newera.com.na
Namibiansun.com
Probono_56-CCPA_HARMFUL_PRACTICES

Namibian culture
Ovambo